Kothrud Assembly constituency is one of the 288 Maharashtra Vidhan Sabha (Assembly) constituencies of Maharashtra state in Western India. It is one of the twenty one constituencies of located in the Pune district and one of eight in Pune City.

It is a part of the Pune (Lok Sabha constituency) along with five other assembly constituencies, viz Kasba Peth, Parvati, Pune Cantonment(SC), Shivajinagar, Vadgaon Sheri from Pune City.

Kothrud Assembly Constituency came into existence by dividing Shivaji Nagar assembly constituency as well as dissolving Bhavani Peth constituency. It was not swing from Nationalist Congress Party to Shiv Sena. It is the stronghold of Shiv Sena. After division Kothrud won by Shiv Sena and Shivajinagar by Vinayak Nimhan, Indian National Congress.

Members of Legislative Assembly

Election results

2019 results

2014 results

2009 results

See also

 Kothrud
 Pune
 Shivajinagar Assembly constituency  (Kothrud area was part of this constituency until 2008)
 List of constituencies of Maharashtra Legislative Assembly

References

Assembly constituencies of Pune district
Assembly constituencies of Maharashtra